The 1962 USAC Road Racing Championship season was the fifth and final season of the USAC Road Racing Championship.  It began April 1, 1962, and ended October 21, 1962, after five races.  The series was contested for Formula Libre at the first two rounds, and sports cars at the final three rounds.  Roger Penske won the season championship.

Calendar

Season results

External links
World Sports Racing Prototypes: 1962 USAC Road Racing Championship
Racing Sports Cars: USAC Road Racing Championship archive

USAC Road Racing Championship
Usac Road Racing
1962 in American motorsport